Gazimestan is the name of a memorial site and monument commemorating the Battle of Kosovo (1389), situated about 6-7 kilometres southeast of the actual battlefield, known as the Kosovo field. The name is a portmanteau derived from Arabic ghazi, meaning "hero" or "champion", and Serbian word mesto, meaning "place". Gazimestan is reached from the Pristina–Mitrovica highway, on a 50-metre hill above the plain, ca. 5 km north-west from Pristina. Every year, on Vidovdan (St. Vitus Day), 28 June, a commemoration is held by the monument, which in later years is also covered by an image of Prince Lazar, who led the Christian army at the battle.

History
The site was the place where Despot Stefan Lazarević erected a marble pillar with an inscription commemorating the battle. That monument disappeared during the Ottoman period. A monumental building in the form of a temple (Vidovdanski hram, "Vidovdan temple") designed by Croatian sculptor Ivan Meštrović was planned but never realized. In 1924 a small monument honouring the Serbian heroes at the battle (Kosovski junaci, "Kosovo heroes") was erected; it was an obelisk with a cross on top. It had a Cyrillic inscription: "To the fallen heroes for the honorable cross, freedom, and rights of their people – 1389 1912 – [by] thankful descendants, citizens and soldiers of the city of Priština". During World War II, just after the Yugoslav capitulation, the monument was mined by Albanian fascist troops and completely destroyed. In the years prior to the war, a larger monument had been planned and a cornerstone placed near where the present monument is, but the threat of war put it on hold. 

Until the end of World War I and the creation of Yugoslavia (1918) there were no conditions or opportunities for large masses to gather at the site. More notable celebrations of Vidovdan (St. Vitus' day) at Gazimestan are noticed only since 1919, in 1924 when the obelisk was erected, and finally before the start of the war, five and a half centuries after the battle. In this period an estimated 20,000–100,000 people gathered on Vidovdan at Gazimestan. Participants included not only native Kosovo Serbs, but also others from distant regions, such as the Bay of Kotor, Dalmatia, Bosnia and Old Montenegro, and Skoplje, Zagreb, Belgrade and some places in Vojvodina. The celebration programme included, from 9 or 10 o'clock, commemoration in liturgy at Gračanica, Samodreža and Gazimestan, speeches, discourses, and artillery fire. In 1935 and 1939 there were also air show.

In 1989, on the 600th anniversary, Serbian president Slobodan Milošević held the famous Gazimestan speech at the site.

In 1997 the site was declared a cultural heritage of Serbia.

In 1999, in the aftermath of the Kosovo War (1998–99) the monumental area was mined.

In 2007, a 14-day march from Belgrade to Gazimestan was organized by several patriotic organizations. 

In 2009, the commemoration brought the biggest crowd since 1999, with several thousand people. 

In 2010, the Kosovo Police was handed over the task of guarding the monument, which was criticised by the Serbian government. In 2014, President Tomislav Nikolić held a speech at the monument.

Monument
The Gazimestan monument was designed by Aleksandar Deroko, in the shape of a medieval tower, and built in 1953 under the authority of SFR Yugoslavia.

See also

Kosovo Myth

Annotations

References

Sources

External links
Eparhija-prizren.com 

Ottoman Serbia
Buildings and structures completed in 1953
Monuments and memorials in Kosovo
Spatial Cultural-Historical Units of Exceptional Importance
Serbian nationalism in Kosovo
1953 establishments in Serbia